Callum Windley (born 26 January 1991) is an English professional rugby league footballer.

Background
Windley was born in Kingston upon Hull, Humberside, England. He is a product of the Bradford Junior Development system.

Bradford Bulls
Statistics do not include pre-season friendlies.

2012 - 2012 Season

Hunslet (Hawks)
2013

Hunslet Hawks announced the signing of Windley on a 1 Year Deal on 8 October 2012. He featured against Roughyeds in the Challenge Cup. Windley also played against Whitehaven and Swinton Lions.

Statistics

Genealogical information
Callum Windley is the son of former rugby league  who played in the 1980s and 1990s for Hull F.C. and Hull Kingston Rovers, and coached in the 1990s for Hull FC; Phil Windley, and he is the nephew of former rugby league  who played in the 1990s and 2000s for Hull F.C. and Hunslet Hawks; Johan Windley.

References

External links
(archived by web.archive.org) Bradford Bulls profile

1991 births
Living people
Bradford Bulls players
English rugby league players
Hunslet R.L.F.C. players
Oxford Rugby League players
Rugby league hookers
Rugby league halfbacks
Rugby league players from Kingston upon Hull